Stachyurus salicifolius, also known by the Chinese vernacular name 柳叶旌节花 (Liǔ yè jīng jié huā), is a species in the genus Stachyurus in the family Stachyuraceae. It is native to China, specifically Chongqing, Sichuan, and northeast Yunnan.

Description
Stachyurus salicifolius is an evergreen shrub which reaches 2-3 metres in height at maturity. In its native habitat, it flowers from April-May and fruits from June-July.

Etymology
Stachyurus is derived from Greek and means 'spiked tail'. The name is a reference to the shape of the inflorescences of this genus.

Salicifolius means 'with leaves resembling those of Salix''' (Salix'' + foliage).

References

Flora of China
Endemic flora of China
Stachyuraceae